Pope Clement X (r. 1670–1676) created 20 cardinals in six consistories.

December 22, 1670

 Federico Borromeo, iuniore
 Camillo Massimo
 Gasparo Carpegna

August 24, 1671

 Bernhard Gustave von Baden-Durlach - Cardinal Priest
 César d'Estrées - Cardinal Bishop
 Juan Everardo Nithard, S.J. - Cardinal Priest

February 22, 1672

 Piero de Bonzi
 Vincenzo Maria Orsini

January 16, 1673

 Felice Rospigliosi

June 12, 1673

 Francesco Nerli (iuniore)
 Girolamo Gastaldi
 Girolamo Casanate
 Federico Baldeschi Colonna
 Pietro Basadonna

May 27, 1675

 Galeazzo Marescotti
 Alessandro Crescenzi
 Bernardino Rocci
 Fabrizio Spada
 Mario Alberizzi
 Philip Howard

References

Clement X
College of Cardinals
17th-century Catholicism
 
Pope Clement X